Jerôme Mvondo (1936 – 15 December 2022) was a Cameroonian journalist and politician.

Biography
Mvondo was originally from Bikok in the Centre Region of Cameroon.

Jerôme Mvondo died on 15 December 2022.

References

1936 births
2022 deaths
Cameroonian journalists
Cameroonian politicians
People from Centre Region (Cameroon)